BKK Radnički history and statistics in FIBA Europe and Euroleague Basketball (company) competitions.

European competitions

Record
BKK Radnički has overall, from 1973–74 (first participation) to 1999–00 (last participation): 32 wins against 25 defeats in 56 games for all the European club competitions.

 EuroLeague: 8–3 (11)
 FIBA Saporta Cup: 18–15 (33) 
 FIBA Korać Cup: 4–6 (10)

External links
FIBA Europe
EuroLeague
ULEB
EuroCup

Yugoslav basketball clubs in European and worldwide competitions
BKK Radnički